Following a successful union vote at Buffalo, New York, locations of the multinational coffeehouse chain Starbucks, multiple other company-owned locations began petitions for union elections.

List 

At least  company-owned Starbucks stores have publicized their petitions for a union ballot in the United States.

References

External links 

 Starbucks representation cases before the National Labor Relations Board
 

Starbucks
Labor relations in the United States
Lists of trade unions